Aquilaria cumingiana is a species of plant in the Thymelaeaceae family. It is found in Indonesia and the Philippines.

References

cumingiana
Vulnerable plants
Taxonomy articles created by Polbot
Taxa named by Joseph Decaisne